In Greek mythology, Hippasus or Hippasos (Ἴππασος) is the name of fourteen characters.

Hippasus, son of King Eurytus of Oechalia and one of the hunters of the Calydonian Boar.
Hippasus from the Pellene district of the Peloponnese, father of Actor, Iphitus, Asterion, Amphion, and Naubolus. The latter four are otherwise ascribed different parentage.
 Hippasus, a Centaur. Killed by Theseus at the wedding of Pirithous and Hippodamia.
 Hippasus, a Trojan prince as one of the sons of Priam.
Hippasus, a Thessalian killed by Agenor in the Trojan War.
 Hippasus, son of King Ceyx of Trachis and possibly, Alcyone, daughter of Aeolus, and thus, brother to Hylas, favorite of Heracles and Themistonoe, wife of Cycnus. Hippasus was killed in battle whilst fighting alongside Heracles against King Eurytus of Oechalia.
 Hippasus, son of Leucippe, one of the Minyades. He was killed by his mother and her sisters.
 Hippasus from Phlius opposed his fellow citizens, who wished to accede to the wishes of the Dorian Rhegnidas and make him their king. He and his fellow supporters fled to Samos. Hippasus is the ancestor of the philosopher Pythagoras, Pythagoras being the son of Mnesarchus, the son of Euphranor, the son of Hippasus.
Hippasus, name shared by fathers of several heroes of the Trojan War:
 of Hippomedon by the nymph Ocyrrhoe
 of Charops and Socus
 of Agelaus the Milesian
 of Coeranus the Lycian
 of Hypsenor
 of Demoleon the Lacedaemonian
 of Apisaon the Paeonian
 of two nameless - only known by the patronymic Hippasides – charioteers:
 the charioteer of Pammon (the son of Priam)
 a Greek charioteer killed by Deiphobus.

See also 
 17492 Hippasos, Jovian asteroid named after Hippasus

Notes

References 

 Antoninus Liberalis, The Metamorphoses of Antoninus Liberalis translated by Francis Celoria (Routledge 1992). Online version at the Topos Text Project.
 Gaius Julius Hyginus, Fabulae from The Myths of Hyginus translated and edited by Mary Grant. University of Kansas Publications in Humanistic Studies. Online version at the Topos Text Project.
 Gaius Valerius Flaccus, Argonautica translated by Mozley, J H. Loeb Classical Library Volume 286. Cambridge, MA, Harvard University Press; London, William Heinemann Ltd. 1928. Online version at theio.com.
 Gaius Valerius Flaccus, Argonauticon. Otto Kramer. Leipzig. Teubner. 1913. Latin text available at the Perseus Digital Library.
 Homer, The Iliad with an English Translation by A.T. Murray, Ph.D. in two volumes. Cambridge, MA., Harvard University Press; London, William Heinemann, Ltd. 1924. Online version at the Perseus Digital Library.
 Homer, Homeri Opera in five volumes. Oxford, Oxford University Press. 1920. Greek text available at the Perseus Digital Library.
 Pausanias, Description of Greece with an English Translation by W.H.S. Jones, Litt.D., and H.A. Ormerod, M.A., in 4 Volumes. Cambridge, MA, Harvard University Press; London, William Heinemann Ltd. 1918. Online version at the Perseus Digital Library
 Pausanias, Graeciae Descriptio. 3 vols. Leipzig, Teubner. 1903.  Greek text available at the Perseus Digital Library.
 Pseudo-Apollodorus, The Library with an English Translation by Sir James George Frazer, F.B.A., F.R.S. in 2 Volumes, Cambridge, MA, Harvard University Press; London, William Heinemann Ltd. 1921. Online version at the Perseus Digital Library. Greek text available from the same website.
 Publius Ovidius Naso, Metamorphoses translated by Brookes More (1859-1942). Boston, Cornhill Publishing Co. 1922. Online version at the Perseus Digital Library.
 Publius Ovidius Naso, Metamorphoses. Hugo Magnus. Gotha (Germany). Friedr. Andr. Perthes. 1892. Latin text available at the Perseus Digital Library.
 Publius Papinius Statius, The Thebaid translated by John Henry Mozley. Loeb Classical Library Volumes. Cambridge, MA, Harvard University Press; London, William Heinemann Ltd. 1928. Online version at the Topos Text Project.
 Publius Papinius Statius, The Thebaid. Vol I-II. John Henry Mozley. London: William Heinemann; New York: G.P. Putnam's Sons. 1928. Latin text available at the Perseus Digital Library.
 Quintus Smyrnaeus, The Fall of Troy translated by Way. A. S. Loeb Classical Library Volume 19. London: William Heinemann, 1913. Online version at theio.com
 Quintus Smyrnaeus, The Fall of Troy. Arthur S. Way. London: William Heinemann; New York: G.P. Putnam's Sons. 1913. Greek text available at the Perseus Digital Library.
Princes in Greek mythology
Children of Priam
Trojans
Achaean characters in Greek mythology